Schechingen is a town in the German state of Baden-Württemberg, in Ostalbkreis district.

Mayors
-1965: Josef Schäffner
1966–1996: Jürgen Schaich
1996–2020: Werner Jekel
since 2020: Stefan Jenninger

References

Ostalbkreis
Württemberg